Lucrezia Borgia (French: Lucrèce Borgia) is a 1935 French historical film directed by Abel Gance and starring Edwige Feuillère, Gabriel Gabrio and Maurice Escande.

Feuillère's performance was widely acclaimed by critics, and significantly boosted her career.

Cast
 Edwige Feuillère as Lucrezia Borgia 
 Gabriel Gabrio as Cesar Borgia  
 Maurice Escande as Jean Borgia, Duke of Gandie  
 Roger Karl as Rodrigo Borgia, Pope Alexander VI
 Aimé Clariond as Niccolò Machiavelli  
 Philippe Hériat as Filippo, sculptor-lover  
 Jacques Dumesnil as Giannino Sforza, Duke of Milano  
 Max Michel as Alfonse de Aragon  
 Louis Eymond as Capt. Mario, officer-lover  
 Jean Fay as Tybald  
 René Bergeron as Pietro  
 Gaston Modot as Fracassa  
 Antonin Artaud as Girolamo Savonarola  
 Marcel Chabrier as Un moine - l'envoyé de Savonarole  
 Georges Prieur as Baron de Villeneuve  
 Louis Perdoux as Carlo  
 Yvonne Drines as Flamette  
 Mona Dol as La Vespa  
 Jeannine Fromentin as La Malatesta  
 Josette Day as Sancia, Lucrezia's companion  
 Daniel Mendaille as Micheletto, chief henchman

References

Bibliography 
 Kennedy-Karpat, Colleen. Rogues, Romance, and Exoticism in French Cinema of the 1930s. Fairleigh Dickinson, 2013.
 Oscherwitz, Dayna Higgins, Maryellen. The A to Z of French Cinema. Scarecrow Press, 2009.

External links 
 

1935 films
French historical films
French black-and-white films
1930s historical films
1930s French-language films
Films directed by Abel Gance
Films set in Italy
Films set in the 16th century
Cultural depictions of Cesare Borgia
Cultural depictions of Lucrezia Borgia
Cultural depictions of Pope Alexander VI
Cultural depictions of Niccolò Machiavelli
Cultural depictions of Girolamo Savonarola
1930s French films